The Monument to the laboratory mouse  is a sculpture in Novosibirsk' Akademgorodok, Siberia, Russia. It is located in a park in front of the Institute of Cytology and Genetics of the Russian Academy of Sciences, and was completed on July 1, 2013, coinciding with the 120th anniversary of the founding of the city.

The monument commemorates the sacrifice of the mice in genetic research used to understand biological and physiological mechanisms for developing new drugs and curing of diseases.

Description

The monument, which sits on a granite pedestal, is of a laboratory mouse wearing pince-nez on the tip of its nose. The mouse holds knitting needles in its paws and is shown knitting a double helix of DNA. The bronze figure is itself only 70 cm (27½”) high, but the total height of the monument including the pedestal is 2.5 meters (98"). The DNA spiral emerging from the knitting needles winds to the left, thus showing that it is the still poorly understood Z-DNA - this symbolic of scientific research that is still to be done. In contrast, the more common B-DNA (depicted in school lessons) winds to the right.

Inscription 
Translated from Russian:

Background
The foundation stone of the monument was laid on June 1, 2012, in honor of the 55th anniversary of the founding of the Institute of Cytology and Genetics. The design for the mouse was the creation of the Novosibirsk artist Andrey Kharkevich, who made more than ten sketches before settling on a final design. It was from among the different versions of the classic and stylized image animals that a mouse knitting the DNA helix was selected.

Andrei Kharkevich described his design, stating, "It combines both the image of a laboratory mouse and a scientist, because they are interconnected and serve the same cause. The mouse is captured at the moment of scientific discovery. If you look closely at her eyes, you can see that this mouse has already come up with something. But the whole symphony of scientific discovery, joy, "eureka!" have not sounded yet."

Sculptor Alexei Agrikolyansky, who made the statue, confessed that it had not been easy to capture that moment as the mouse was obviously not human and yet he had to produce a character and emotions for the mouse that were believable and, while maintaining the anatomical proportions, create something that neither looked like a cartoon character nor a real mouse.

The sculpture was cast from bronze in Tomsk by Maxim Petrov.

References

External links
 

Laboratory mice
Science and technology in Siberia
Sovetsky District, Novosibirsk
Outdoor sculptures in Russia
Mice and rats in art
Animal sculptures
Science in art
Monuments and memorials in Russia